The Black Pierrot is a 1926 German silent film directed by and starring Harry Piel.

The film's sets were designed by the art director Kurt Richter.

Cast

References

Bibliography

External links

1926 films
Films of the Weimar Republic
Films directed by Harry Piel
German silent feature films
German black-and-white films
Phoebus Film films